Ambrose-Ward Mansion is located in East Orange, Essex County, New Jersey. The mansion was built in 1889 and was added to the National Register of Historic Places on September 20, 1982.

See also
National Register of Historic Places listings in Essex County, New Jersey

References

East Orange, New Jersey
Houses on the National Register of Historic Places in New Jersey
Houses completed in 1889
Houses in Essex County, New Jersey
National Register of Historic Places in Essex County, New Jersey
New Jersey Register of Historic Places